Vinovka is a rural locality (a selo) in Yerzkovskoye Urban Settlement, Gorodishchensky District, Volgograd Oblast, Russia. The population was 15 as of 2010.

Geography 
Vinovka is located on the right bank of the Volga River, 24 km northeast of Gorodishche (the district's administrative centre) by road. Spartanovka is the nearest rural locality.

References 

Rural localities in Gorodishchensky District, Volgograd Oblast
Tsaritsynsky Uyezd